Hamilton Parish Football Club are a Bermudan football club based in Hamilton Parish, Bermuda. They currently play in the Bermudian Premier Division.

History
Also named Hamilton Parish Hot Peppers, the club have been in the Bermudian Premier Division since winning promotion in March 2013. They secured the First Division title a week after promotion was confirmed.

Players

Current squad
 For 2015–2016 season

Historical list of coaches

 Kieshon Smith (2011- Jul 2015)
 Phillip Burgess (Aug 2015–present)

References

External links
 Club page - Bermuda FA

Football clubs in Bermuda